Southern Biscuit Company, also known as Interbake Foods, Inc. and Famous Foods of Virginia (FFV), is a historic factory building located in Richmond, Virginia.  The original section was built in 1927, and is a six-story, reinforced concrete building. It was subsequently expanded four times through 1951. The building features a water tower and distinctive roof-top sign. The sign has three rows of letters spelling "HOME OF", "FFV", and "COOKIES AND CRACKERS". The facility closed in 2006.

A 2014 renovation transformed the factory into a 178-unit apartment building.

The Southern Biscuit Company Building was listed on the National Register of Historic Places in 2012.

References

External links
 Cookie Factory Lofts history

Industrial buildings and structures on the National Register of Historic Places in Virginia
Industrial buildings completed in 1927
Buildings and structures in Richmond, Virginia
National Register of Historic Places in Richmond, Virginia
Apartment buildings in Virginia
Bakeries of the United States